Caroline S. Harwood is an American microbiologist who was elected to the National Academy of Sciences in 2009. She is the Professor Gerald and Lyn Grinstein Professor of Microbiology and Associate Vice-Provost for Research at the University of Washington School of Medicine.

Education 
Harwood attended Concord Academy, a girl's high school in Concord, Massachusetts.  She studied at Colby College in Maine, and then received a master's degree in biology from Boston University. She studied under Ercole Canale-Parola at the University of Massachusetts Amherst, where she received her PhD in microbiology. She finished her post-doctoral studies at Yale University.

Teaching 
Harwood held an academic appointment at Cornell University, and she was a professor of microbiology at the University of Iowa from 1988 until 2004. Since 2005 she has been teaching at the University of Washington.

Research 
Her research topics include metabolic networks, bacterial signaling, and bioenergy production.  Harwood demonstrated that soil bacteria catabolize some of the hardest compounds found in nature, such as lignin components and compounds that cause pollution. She was the head of the project that uncovered the sequence of the genome of Rhodopseudomonas palustris, a bacterium that performs photosynthesis and is capable of heterotrophy and hydrogen production.

In January 2018 Harwood was the senior author in an article published in Nature Microbiology describing the discovery of a previously unknown enzymatic pathway for the natural biological production of methane.

Elected memberships 
Harwood is an elected member of the National Academy of Sciences, the American Association for the Advancement of Sciences and the American Academy of Microbiology.

Awards 
In 2010 Harwood received the Procter & Gamble Award in Applied and Environmental Microbiology.

References 

Year of birth missing (living people)
Living people
American women biologists
Women microbiologists
Members of the United States National Academy of Sciences
University of Iowa faculty
University of Washington faculty
Concord Academy alumni
Cornell University faculty
Fellows of the American Association for the Advancement of Science
Colby College alumni
Boston University alumni
University of Massachusetts Amherst alumni
American microbiologists
21st-century American biologists
20th-century American biologists
21st-century American women scientists
20th-century American women scientists
American women academics